Common names: slender hognosed pitviper, western hog-nosed viper.

Porthidium ophryomegas is a venomous pitviper species found in Central America. No subspecies are currently recognized.

Description
One exceptional specimen, a female, was reported to measure .

The color pattern consists of a tan, brown, gray or grayish-brown ground color overlaid with a narrow white, yellow or rust brown vertebral stripe and 24–40 dark brown to almost black blotches that oppose or alternate across the vertebral line. The blotches have thin white borders that extend at roughly a right angle from the vertebral line.

Geographic range
Found in Central America in Guatemala, El Salvador, Honduras, Nicaragua and Costa Rica. The type locality given is "les terres chaudes du versant occidental de la Cordillère Escuintla (Guatémala)" (= warm regions on western slope of Cordillera, Escuintla, Guatemala).

Habitat
Occurs in seasonally dry forests, including tropical dry forests, arid forests, subtropical dry forests, and the more arid parts of tropical moist forests.

Behavior
When threatened, these snakes have been known to defend themselves vigorously, often striking with such force that the body is thrown forwards or even leaves the ground.

Feeding
The diet consists of rodents and lizards. Juveniles feed mostly on lizards, as well as small frogs if available.

Reproduction
Ovoviviparous, females give birth to live young that are about 6 inches (15 cm) in length.

Venom
One death was confirmed in August, 2022. They are quick to strike and several cases of serious envenomation have required hospitalization. According to Bolaños (1984), of the 477 cases of snakebite in Costa Rica in 1979, three were due to these snakes.

References

Further reading
 Bocourt, M.F. 1868. Descriptions de quelques Crotaliens nouveaux appartenant au genre Bothrops, recueillis dans le Guatémala. Annales des sciences naturelles, Series 5, 10: 201-202. ("Bothrops ophryomegas n. sp.")

External links
 

ophryomegas
Snakes of Central America
Reptiles of Costa Rica
Reptiles of El Salvador
Reptiles of Guatemala
Reptiles of Honduras
Reptiles of Nicaragua
Reptiles described in 1868